Eduardo Fentanes Orozco (born 9 July 1977) is a Mexican football manager of Liga MX club Santos Laguna.

Academic preparation 

 At 19 years old, Fentanes becomes the youngest technical director titled in Mexico by Femexfut in 1996.
 In the period from 1997 to 1998, he studied the Diploma in Sports Psychology from the Intercontinental University.
 From 1999 to 2000, he successfully completed the Expert Diploma in sports training from the UNED in Madrid, Spain.
 Since 2011 he has been a teacher at the Johan Cruyff Institute, participating in some modules in the subject of 'Theory of Soccer'.
 Since 2019, Fentanes has been certified as a Professional Coach by the TEAM Power Institute.
 Speaks English fluently, in addition to Spanish as mother tongue.

Soccer Analyst career 
Beginnings (1998-2003)

From the age of 21, Fentanes participated as an analyst for various Mexican soccer coaches, such as Roberto Matosas, Luis Flores, Eduardo Rergis, Francisco Ramírez, Enrique Meza, Carlos Reinoso, José Guadalupe Cruz and Sergio Bueno

Mexico national football team (2003-2006 and 2008-2009).

He participated as a viewer of rivals, scout, analysis, evaluation of performance and individual monitoring, in the processes of the national team with Ricardo La Volpe, from 2003 to 2006 and Sven Goran Eriksson from 2008 to 2009. During Ricardo La Volpe's time, he collaborated in the 2005 FIFA Confederations Cup in Germany and the 2006 FIFA World Cup in Germany. In 2008, he served as an opponent analyst for Swedish manager Sven-Göran Eriksson ahead of the 2010 FIFA World Cup South Africa, in the qualifying process and international friendly matches

Career as Second Manager 
Monarcas Morelia (First “A”) (2006).

He began his career as a technical assistant in 2006, just after the World Cup, with the Liga de Ascenso second team of Monarcas Morelia y the Mexican second division, being coach of the team, Ignacio Palou, who is currently Sports Director of Club Tijuana.

Club Puebla F.C. (2007-2010).

He continued his career as a technical assistant, with José Luis Sánchez Solá 'Chelis' from 2007 to 2011, achieving Puebla's promotion to the First Division in the first season that he joined the team. In the First Division, Puebla achieved, firstly, the right to remain in the highest category avoiding relegation, reaching the finals of the tournament, playing the Quarterfinals and the Semifinals in the Clausura 2009. In 2010, he guided two games for Puebla as an interim coach, with a balance of one victory and one defeat, after this period, he returned to his former role as assistant to ‘Chelis.'

Club Deportivo Estudiantes Tecos (2011).

He arrived at Club Deportivo Estudiantes Tecos in 2011, with José Luis Sánchez Solá, again. In Tecos they remained until August of that year, having interesting results in the regular phase of the competition, but without being able to reach the Finals stage.

Club Atlante (2012).

In Clausura 2012, he participated as technical assistant to Mario García with Atlante F.C., the team failed to reach the Liguilla.

Club Deportivo Guadalajara (2012).

For the 2012 Apertura, he arrived at Club Deportivo Guadalajara, as assistant to the Dutch coach, John van 't Schip, who arrived at the Club as part of the sports restructuring project led by dutch soccer legend, Johan Cruyff. The team managed to qualify for the Liguilla, having an irregular performance in the CONCACAF Champions League, but convincingly winning the match against Club América 3-1 in October of that year.

Tijuana Club (2013-2014).

In the 2013-2014 season, he participated as technical assistant for Jorge Francisco Almirón and César Farías, respectively. In that sporting year, he reached the quarterfinal stage of the league for the title. Almirón later managed Club Atlético Lanús of Argentina achieving the sub-championship of the Copa Libertadores de América in 2017 and Farías, who had managed the National Team of his country, Venezuela, currently manages Bolivia. Fentanes was an assistant in Tijuana in 55 official games, 34 with César Farías and 21 with Jorge Francisco Almirón.

Bolivia National Team (2018).

In May 2018, and thanks to the employment relationship with the Venezuelan coach, César Farias, as a result of the time he was his assistant in Tijuana in Liga MX, Fentanes was invited to be Farias' assistant in the Bolivia national team, for an international friendly game against the United States, losing 3-0 in a game played on North American soil. Fentanes collaborated both in the training week and in the game itself.

Coaching career 
Club San Luis (2013).

At the beginning of 2013, he was appointed as coach of San Luis, in Liga MX, having a record of ten games directed, between Liga MX and Copa MX, with three wins, two draws and five losses. At that stage, he coached figures such as Oscar 'Conejo' Pérez, Javier Muñoz Mustafá, Mario Méndez or Juan Ezequiel Cuevas, among others.

Dorados de Sinaloa (2014). For the 2014 Apertura, he had his first experience directing in the Liga de Ascenso, taking charge of the Dorados de Sinaloa, a team with which he was on the bench in 8 matches between Ascenso MX and Copa MX, with a record of three wins, three draws and two losses. Despite the fact that there were few games, the percentage of effectiveness and the progress of the team improved with respect to the immediate previous situation, to the point where Fentanes arrived to the team.

Club Atlante (2015-2017).

In April 2015, he became coach of Atlante, at a very positive and successful period in his coaching career. With the 'Iron Colts', at the time when they played at home in Cancun, Quintana Roo, Fentanes managed 101 games, with a record of 37 wins, 31 draws and 29 losses. During his time as Atlantista, they won the Sub-championship in the Apertura 2015 and Apertura 2016 tournaments, as well as a Semifinal phase in the Clausura 2016, being on the verge of reaching the return of Atlante to the highest category of Mexican football, since its relegation in 2014. At Atlante he coached such players as Jimmy Bermúdez, who played as an international with Equatorial Guinea, the Paraguayans David Mendieta and Enzo Prono as well as the Ecuadorian forward Carlos Garcés or the attacking midfielder Gabriel Hachen, who emerged as an important player with goals and assists in the management of Fentanes. It was Garcés himself who won the top goalscorer title of the Liga de Ascenso in the 2015 Apertura with 11 goals scored for the Atlantic cause. This Atlante of the two promotion finals is also remembered for the contribution of the brothers Paul and Oscar Uscanga in the team's midfield, playing together in that area of the pitch, with positive results. In Copa MX, they achieved resounding victories against Liga MX teams, such as the victory against Pachuca 3-2 in Cancún in 2015, or the positive result by 3-1 against Club León in an away match in 2016.

Club Tampico Madero F.C. (2017-2018).

In May 2017, he was appointed as coach of Tampico Madero, where he led 35 official matches in Ascenso MX, with a record of 14 wins, 9 draws and 12 losses, with an effectiveness rate close to 50 percent. With Tampico Madero F.C. reached the Semifinal phase of the 2017 Apertura Tournament, becoming the best defense in the championship in the 2018 Clausura season, and the best offense side at home throughout the season. In Copa MX he managed to play with Liga MX teams, such as Veracruz, Atlas, Santos Laguna, Necaxa and Pumas UNAM. Getting victories against Veracruz, Atlas and Necaxa respectively. In the 2018 edition, they reached the round of 16 of the competition, falling to Santos Laguna 1-0. In Tampico, Fentanes coached soccer players like Julio González, Omar Esparza, José Antonio Olvera, Javier 'Chuletita' Orozco and Eduardo Aguirre. It is worth mentioning the contribution of Javier Orozco, who with the colors of Tampico scored on numerous occasions during the management of Fentanes, and beyond the fact that he was not able to won top goalscorer award of the season; he was close to achieving it.

Club Santos Laguna (2022).

In February 2022, after three years as director of the institution's Youth ranks from 2018 to 2021, and a stage as sports director, he was appointed coach of Santos Laguna, after portuguese coach Pedro Caixinha left. To date, he has led four games, with three wins and one loss, taking the team out of the last places in Clausura 2022.Fentanes has Rafael Figueroa and Roberto Tapía as assistants in Santos Laguna.

Footnotes

1977 births
Living people
San Luis F.C. managers
Mexican football managers